Haim Wasserzug (1822 – 24 August 1882), also known as Haim Lomzer, was an English ḥazzan and composer. Some of the principal cantors of the European continent and of America were numbered among his disciples.

Biography
Wasserzug was born at Sieradz, Prussian partition of Poland, in 1822, where his father filled the office of cantor. As a child he was endowed with a remarkably sweet voice, and in 1840 he was elected ḥazzan at Konin. His renown soon spread among the Jewish communities of Poland, and he received a call as ḥazzan to Novy-Dvor, where his introduction of four-part choral singing instead of traditional ḥazzanut aroused considerable opposition against him on the part of the Ḥasidim. Thirteen years later he was appointed to a post at Lonisa, near the Lithuanian frontier. Here he remained for five years, when he was elected cantor of the Great Synagogue of Vilna. In 1867, on the opening of the North London Synagogue, he was elected its First Reader, which office he held until his death in 1882.

In 1878 he published Sefer shire mikdash, a collection of 143 compositions written during his ḥazzanship at Vilna, which received high commendation by Nikolai Zaremba, Henry Wylde, and others. It includes his best known work, a setting of Zokhrenu l'ḥayyim. Works by Wasserzug were also included in The Voice of Prayer and Praise, a popular anthology of Ashkenazi synagogue music used in British Orthodox synagogues.

He died on 24 August 1882 at the Royal Sussex Hospital, Brighton, after catching a chill from remaining in the water for too long while sea bathing. He was survived by his wife Rebecca  and 15 children, five of whom were the offspring of his first marriage with her sister Rachel .

Personal life
Wasserzug's daughter Sara was married to Rev. Abraham Levinson, who served the Middle Street Synagogue, Brighton, for 31 years. His son, David Wasserzug, was educated at Jews' College, London, and officiated as rabbi at Cardiff, Port Elizabeth, Johannesburg, and, after 1905, at the Dalston Synagogue, London. Another son, William, studied at the Leipzig Conservatorium and was Choirmaster of the Bayswater Synagogue, while his youngest son Israel (later known as Ivor Warren) was Choirmaster of the Liberal Jewish Synagogue at St John's Wood.

Publications

References
 

1822 births
1882 deaths
19th-century British Jews
English male composers
English people of Polish-Jewish descent
Hazzans
Jewish composers
People from Sieradz